LSM Launch Coaster (Vekoma) can refer to two roller similar roller coasters and a separate duelling coaster:
Rock 'n' Roller Coaster - Walt Disney World Resort and Walt Disney Studios
Xpress: Platform 13 - Walibi Holland
Battlestar Galactica: Human vs. Cylon - Universal Studios Singapore